Tom Tribe (4 February 1919 – 23 December 1992) was  a former Australian rules footballer who played with Footscray in the Victorian Football League (VFL).	

Originally from Victorian Football Association (VFA) club Yarraville, Tribe was recruited by Footscray for the 1939 VFL season and played 101 games until his retirement in 1946.

Notes

External links 
		
Tom Tribe's profile at Australianfootball.com

1919 births
1992 deaths
Australian rules footballers from Victoria (Australia)
Western Bulldogs players
Yarraville Football Club players